Nogebus is a Spain-based coachbuilder. The company builds bus and coach bodies on various possible chassis. Their products are sold throughout all of Western Europe.

The company, originally named Noge, collapsed in January 2013. However, later that year it was acquired by another Catalan company, Sartruck, and resumed its activities.

Noge was, after Indcar, Ayats and Beulas, the fourth coachbuilding company to be founded in Girona, Catalonia. It was established in 1964 by a former Ayats worker, Miquel Genabat Puig (whose son presides the company today) and by Josep Noguera, who dissociated himself from the company in 1978. Noge began its activities building city buses but soon expanded to intercity and luxury coaches as well. In its heyday, the company had over 250 employees and produced an average of 600 vehicles a year. The workforce had been reduced to 93 by the time the factory temporarily closed in early 2013. 22 of these workers were rehired by the new company Nogebus. By the time activities restarted in July 2013, the company had 32 employees, and an objective of building 60–70 coaches per year, initially only for Spanish operators and later for other European markets. 

On November 17, 2022, Nogebus filed for insolvency proceedings.

Products
 Cittour - city bus
 Aertour - airport shuttle bus
 Touring - coach
 Titanium - luxury coach

References

External links
Official Nogebus website (in English)

Bus manufacturers of Spain
Vehicle manufacturing companies established in 1964
Companies based in Catalonia
Spanish brands
Girona